

43001–43100 

|-id=025
| 43025 Valusha ||  || Valentina I. Ipatova-Artioukhova (born 1954), Russian hydrobiologist || 
|-id=081
| 43081 Stephenschwartz ||  || Stephen Schwartz (born 1980) is a postdoctoral research associate at the Lunar and Planetary Laboratory (Tucson, AZ). He specializes in orbital dynamics, planetary astronomy, planetary surfaces, small bodies, and space situational awareness. || 
|-id=083
| 43083 Frankconrad || 1999 WR || Frank Conrad (1874–1941), American amateur astronomer, past president of the Baton Rouge Astronomical Society, friend of the discoverer || 
|}

43101–43200 

|-id=188
| 43188 Zouxiaoduan ||  || Xiao-duan Zou (born 1983) is a Chinese research scientist at the Planetary Science Institute (Tucson, Arizona). She studies physical properties of the surfaces of the Moon, asteroids and cometary nuclei. She also worked for the Chinese Lunar Exploration Project (Chang'e 1 to Chang'e 5). || 
|-id=193
| 43193 Secinaro ||  || Secinaro, L'Aquila, Italy, location of what is probably the first Italian meteoric impact crater discovery (dating to the fourth or fifth century) || 
|}

43201–43300 

|-id=212
| 43212 Katosawao ||  || Sawao Katō (born 1946) competed in three Olympics from 1968 to 1976 winning twelve medals in gymnastics including eight gold medals, the most for any Japanese Olympic athlete. He was inducted into the International Gymnastics Hall of Fame in 2001. || 
|-id=224
| 43224 Tonypensa ||  || Anthony Pensa (born 1943), American assistant director of the MIT Lincoln Laboratory, on the occasion of his retirement || 
|-id=259
| 43259 Wangzhenyi ||  || Wang Zhenyi (born 1924), hematologist-academician of the Chinese Academy of Engineering. || 
|-id=282
| 43282 Dougbock ||  || Doug Bock (born 1956) is well known in amateur astronomy in the midwest U.S. having received numerous awards and served as an officer in several clubs including Vice-Chairman of the Great Lakes Region of the Astronomical League from 1980-82. He is an avid observer and imager from his Boon Hill Observatory in Michigan. || 
|-id=283
| 43283 Robinbock ||  || Robin Bock (born 1957) is a Michigan amateur astronomer who served as Treasurer of the Warren Astronomical Society from 1979–1980 and then as Vice Chairperson and Secretary of the Great Lakes Region of the Astronomical League. || 
|-id=293
| 43293 Banting ||  || Frederick Banting (1891–1941), Canadian medical doctor, discoverer of insulin || 
|}

43301–43400 

|-id=368
| 43368 Rodrigoleiva ||  || Rodrigo Leiva (born 1980) is a postdoctoral associate at Southwest Research Institute (Boulder, CO). His studies include Pluto, trans-Neptunian objects, centaurs, and studying small-body rings through stellar occultations. || 
|}

43401–43500 

|-id=414
| 43414 Sfair ||  || Rafael Sfair (born 1984) is a professor at Universidade Estadual Paulista Julio de Mesquita Filho, Brazil. He has experience in numerical simulation and image analysis for Dynamical Astronomy, focusing on ring interaction and stability with different dissipative forces. || 
|-id=436
| 43436 Ansschut ||  || Ans Schut (born 1944) set an Olympic record in speed skating at the 1968 Olympics as a member of the Netherlands Olympic team. She set several world records in international events the following year. She retired from competition in 1971. || 
|}

43501–43600 

|-id=511
| 43511 Cima Ekar ||  || Stazione osservativa di Asiago Cima Ekar (Cima Ekar Observing Station), a.k.a. Osservatorio Astronomico di Monte Ekar, the largest astronomical facility of Italy || 
|-id=597
| 43597 Changshaopo ||  || Changshaopo (born 1932) is a Marist brother who served as the principal of St. Francis Xavier's School in Hong Kong from 1974 to 1997. He devoted himself to educating the younger generation, practicing the school's motto Integrity and Universal Love || 
|}

43601–43700 

|-id=605
| 43605 Gakuho ||  || Aizu Gakuho is a senior and junior high school in Aizuwakamatsu city in Fukushima prefecture, Japan, founded in 1924. Gakuho means wisdom and a phoenix flying in space. || 
|-id=657
| 43657 Bobmiller ||  || Robert Donald Miller, an astronomer with Michigan State University's on-campus observatory for three decades || 
|-id=667
| 43667 Dumlupınar ||  || Dumlupınar, the Turkish submarine which, while crossing the Dardanelles on 1953 April 4, collided with the Swedish freighter Naboland and sank, killing all 81 men aboard || 
|-id=669
| 43669 Winterthur ||  || The city of Winterthur, Switzerland, birthplace of the discoverer Markus Griesser and home of the Eschenberg Observatory || 
|}

43701–43800 

|-id=706
| 43706 Iphiklos || 1416 T-2 || Iphiklos, father of the Trojan war Greek hero Podarkes of Phylake || 
|-id=722
| 43722 Carloseduardo || 1968 OB || Carlos Eduardo López (born 1953), an Argentine astronomer. || 
|-id=724
| 43724 Pechstein || 1975 UY || Max Pechstein (1881–1955), German painter, leading member of the German expressionists known as "Die Brücke" || 
|-id=751
| 43751 Asam ||  || The Bavarian family of fresco painters, stucco sculptors, and architects: father Hans Georg Asam (1649–1711) and his sons Cosmas Damian Asam (1686–1739) and Egid Quirin Asam (1692–1750) || 
|-id=752
| 43752 Maryosipova ||  || Maria Yur'evna Osipova (born 1977), younger daughter of the discoverer || 
|-id=763
| 43763 Russert ||  || Tim Russert (1950–2008), an author, Washington bureau chief and political analyst for NBC News || 
|-id=767
| 43767 Permeke ||  || Constant Permeke, Belgian painter and sculptor || 
|-id=768
| 43768 Lynevans ||  || Lyn Evans (born 1945), a Welsh scientist and project leader of the Large Hadron Collider at CERN. || 
|-id=775
| 43775 Tiepolo ||  || Giovanni Battista Tiepolo (1696–1770), Italian Rococo painter and printmaker || 
|-id=783
| 43783 Svyatitelpyotr ||  || Saint Pyotr (Svyatitel Pyotr; died 1326) was an outstanding statesman and orthodox religious hierarch, talented icon painter and writer. In 1308–1326 he was the Metropolitan of Kiev and All Russia and in 1325 he moved the Metropolitan See from Vladimir to Moscow. He founded the Vysokopetrovsky Monastery in 1315. || 
|-id=790
| 43790 Ferdinandbraun ||  || Karl Ferdinand Braun (1850–1918), a German physicist, inventor of the "Braun tube", the forerunner of the television tube, co-winner of the 1909 Nobel Prize in physics for wireless telegraphy || 
|-id=793
| 43793 Mackey ||  || Lance Mackey (born 1970), American dog musher, first to win the 1000-mile Yukon Quest and the 1100-mile Iditarod back to back (in 2007) || 
|-id=794
| 43794 Yabetakemoto || 1990 YP || Akihiko Yabe (born 1939) and Akikazu Takemoto (born 1941) are Japan's leading Masters Games swimmers || 
|}

43801–43900 

|-id=804
| 43804 Peterting ||  || Peter M. Ting (born 1948), American anesthesiologist || 
|-id=806
| 43806 Augustepiccard ||  || Auguste Piccard (1884–1962), Swiss physicist, explorer of the upper stratosphere and the depths of the ocean || 
|-id=813
| 43813 Kühner ||  || Stefan Kühner (born 1970), a German electronics technician, is an enthusiastic amateur astronomer and experienced short-wave radio operator || 
|-id=841
| 43841 Marcustacitus || 1993 HB || Marcus Claudius Tacitus (c. 200–276), Roman emperor || 
|-id=843
| 43843 Cleynaerts ||  || Nicolas Cleynaerts (1495–1542), a Flemish humanist || 
|-id=844
| 43844 Rowling ||  || J. K. Rowling (born 1965), British author, best known for the Harry Potter series || 
|-id=857
| 43857 Tanijinzan ||  || Tani Jinzan (1663–1718) was a Japanese astronomer and calendrical scholar in Tosa (modern-day Kochi prefecture) during Japan's Edo period. By using observations of the Sun, the Moon, and the constellations, he accurately determined the latitude of Kochi Castle in 1694. || 
|-id=859
| 43859 Naoyayano ||  || Naoya (born 1998) and Ayano Fujii (born 2001), children of Hiroshi Fujii, who co-discovered this minor planet. || 
|-id=881
| 43881 Cerreto ||  || Cerreto d'Asti, Piedmont, Italy, home to the Cerreto d'Asti Astronomical Observatory || 
|-id=882
| 43882 Maurivicoli ||  || Maurizio Vicoli (born 1964), Italian philosopher and astronomer || 
|-id=889
| 43889 Osawatakaomi || 1995 QH || Osawa Takaomi (born 1957), Japanese pharmacist and amateur astronomer, independent discoverer of comet  || 
|-id=890
| 43890 Katiaottani ||  || Katia Ottani (1959–2006), Italian elementary-school teacher and friend of Ermes Colombini, who co-discovered this minor planet || 
|}

43901–44000 

|-id=908
| 43908 Hiraku ||  || Hiraku Togashi (born 1955) became a member of the Yamagata Astronomical Society in 1998 and actively popularizes astronomy. || 
|-id=923
| 43923 Cosimonoccioli ||  || Cosimo Noccioli (born 2001), an Italian amateur astronomer who is a member of the astronomy club at Montelupo. || 
|-id=924
| 43924 Martoni ||  || Aurora Martoni (born 2012), granddaughter of Antonio Vagnozzi who discovered this minor planet || 
|-id=931
| 43931 Yoshimi ||  || Yoshimi Takahashi (1925–2005), Japanese amateur astronomer who contributed to the establishment of the Nanyo Astronomical Lovers Club and the Nanyo Citizen's Astronomical Observatory || 
|-id=935
| 43935 Danshechtman || 1996 TF || Dan Shechtman (born 1941) is an Israeli physicist who won the Nobel Prize for chemistry in 2011 || 
|-id=954
| 43954 Chýnov ||  || The Czech town of Chýnov in south Bohemia, site of a well-known cave discovered in 1863 || 
|-id=955
| 43955 Fixlmüller ||  || Placidus Fixlmillner (Fixlmüller; 1721–1791), Austrian astronomer || 
|-id=956
| 43956 Elidoro ||  || Claudio Elidoro (born 1956), Italian astronomer and popularizer || 
|-id=957
| 43957 Invernizzi ||  || Luca Invernizzi (born 1966), Italian author and amateur astronomer, founder of the Astronomy Club at Valtellina ( and co-promoter of the Giuseppe Piazzi Observatory  || 
|-id=971
| 43971 Gabzdyl ||  || Pavel Gabzdyl (born 1974), Czech planetary astronomer and author || 
|-id=993
| 43993 Mariola || 1997 OK || Mariola Magnoni Tieghi (born 1934), former president of the Como Inner Wheel Club || 
|-id=998
| 43998 Nanyoshino ||  || Nanyo Yosginogawa River flows through the center of Nanyo City, Yamagata prefecture, and joins Mogami River. || 
|-id=999
| 43999 Gramigna ||  || Paolo Gramigna (born 1946), Italian amateur astronomer at the Livergnano Observatory  || 
|-id=000
| 44000 Lucka || 1997 RB || Lucie Glöcknerová (born 2012) is the discoverer's younger daughter. || 
|}

References 

043001-044000